"Do You Want to Know a Secret" is a song by English rock band the Beatles from their 1963 album Please Please Me, sung by George Harrison. In the United States, it was the first top ten song to feature Harrison as a lead singer, reaching No. 2 on the Billboard chart in 1964 as a single released by Vee-Jay, VJ 587. In the UK, Billy J. Kramer released a cover of the song as his debut single, reaching No. 1 on the NME singles chart and No. 2 on the Record Retailer chart.

Composition
"Do You Want to Know a Secret", written in autumn 1962, was primarily composed by John Lennon but credited to Lennon–McCartney. The 1963 version by Billy J. Kramer with the Dakotas (a UK No. 2) credited the composition to "McCartney–Lennon". The song was inspired by "I'm Wishing", a tune from Walt Disney’s 1937 animated film Snow White and the Seven Dwarfs which Lennon's mother, Julia Lennon, would sing to him as a child. The first two lines of the song in Disney's movie ("Want to know a secret? Promise not to tell?") come right after the opening lyrics ("You'll never know how much I really love you... You'll never know how much I really care..."). McCartney has said it was a "50–50 collaboration written to order", i.e., for Harrison to sing, but Lennon, who always claimed the song as his own, explained in a 1980 interview that he had realized as soon as he had finished writing the song that it best suited Harrison.

Recording
In 1980, Lennon said that he gave "Do You Want to Know a Secret" to Harrison to sing because "it only had three notes and he wasn't the best singer in the world", but added "he has improved a lot since then." The song was recorded as part of their marathon ten-hour recording session on 11 February 1963 along with nine other songs for Please Please Me. Harrison sang two songs on Please Please Me—this song by Lennon–McCartney and "Chains" by Goffin/King. "Don't Bother Me" would be Harrison's debut composition and appeared on the Beatles' next UK album With the Beatles.

Harrison and Lennon both played acoustic guitars on the recording in different channels – on the stereo mix, Harrison's guitar was panned to the right channel while Lennon's was panned to the left.

Single release
"Do You Want to Know a Secret" was released a year later as a single by Vee-Jay in the United States on 23 March 1964, reaching the number two spot behind "Hello, Dolly!" by Louis Armstrong in Billboard, reaching number three on the Cash Box chart, but reaching number one for two weeks in the chart published by the Teletheatre Research Institute.  In the U.S., it was the most successful Beatles song on which Harrison sang lead vocal until "Something" peaked at No. 1 as part of a double-sided number one hit with "Come Together" in 1969.

Personnel
 George Harrisonlead vocals, acoustic guitar (right channel)
 John Lennonacoustic guitar (left channel), backing vocals
 Paul McCartneybass guitar, backing vocals
 Ringo Starrdrums, tapped drumsticks

Engineered by Norman Smith

Personnel per Walter Everett and John Winn

Charts and certifications

Charts

Certifications

The Billy J. Kramer version

The Beatles' version was never released as a single in the UK, where a cover version by Billy J. Kramer with the Dakotas (released b/w "I'll Be on My Way", Parlophone R5023, 26 April 1963) reached number two in the Record Retailer chart, and hit number one in the NME chart (used by Radio Luxembourg) and the BBC's Pick of the Pops chart, which were more widely recognised at the time. It appeared on his album, Little Children. It reached number eight in the Irish Singles Chart.

Chart performance

Other cover versions

Alvin and the Chipmunks covered the song for their 1964 album The Chipmunks Sing the Beatles Hits.

Santo and Johnny, Count Basie and His Orchestra, Mary Wells, Keely Smith, Sonny Curtis, Bobby Vee, The Johnny Mann Singers, The Ray Charles Singers, Sharon Clark, Fairground Attraction, and The Hollyridge Strings also recorded the song.

Swedish actress and recording artist Anita Lindblom recorded a Swedish-language version titled "Lyssna (vill du veta vad jag tänker?)" for her 1968 album Sån't är livet.

The song reached the No. 1 position on Billboard in 1981 and No. 2 in the United Kingdom as part of the cover-medley "Stars on 45".

Notes

References

External links

 
 

1960s ballads
1963 singles
1964 singles
The Beatles songs
Billy J. Kramer songs
Santo & Johnny songs
Pop ballads
Song recordings produced by George Martin
Songs written by Lennon–McCartney
Vee-Jay Records singles
Songs published by Northern Songs
1963 songs
Parlophone singles
Imperial Records singles